FIRSTFRUITS is a United States counterintelligence program and database that tracks unauthorized disclosures of intelligence material in the news media. The project's goal is to reduce losses of collection capability due to journalists. The database was created by the US Central Intelligence Agency, but then transferred to US National Security Agency. The database has thousands of unofficial and negative articles and authors. Maintenance of the program was outsourced to third parties like Booz Allen Hamilton. The program became known through whistleblower Edward Snowden.

Joseph J. Brand, a senior US National Security Agency (NSA) official, was a leading advocate of a crackdown on leaks from whistleblowers in the US. In 2001 the NSA created a department and staffed it with "leak trackers." The CIA hired a contractor "to build [a] foreign knowledge database". The program was funded by the CIA. The name played on the phrase "the fruits of our labor".

According to Brand, "Adversaries know more about SIGINT sources and methods today than ever before,". Brand noted some disclosures came from the U.S. government's own official communications; and other secrets were acquired by foreign spies. But "most often these disclosures occur through the media." Brand listed four "flagrant media leakers" in his presentation: The Washington Post,  The New York Times, The New Yorker, and The Washington Times. Journalist tracked in the database include Bill Gertz, Seymour Hersh, James Bamford, James Risen, Vernon Loeb, John C. K. Daly, and Barton Gellman.

Journalist in the database are tracked by the intelligence agency with regular reports going to the Federal Bureau of Investigation and Department of Justice for possible prosecution.

Controversy

According to Barton Gellman, ''"Brand's accounting — like many of the government's public assertions — left something to be desired:

... the most frequent accusation invoked in debates about whether journalists cause “impairment” to the U.S. government is that it was journalists’ fault that the U.S. lost access to Osama bin Laden’s satellite-phone communications in the late 1990s. It is hard to overstate the centrality of this episode to the intelligence community’s lore about the news media. The accusation, as best as I can ascertain, was first made publicly in 2002 by then–White House Press Secretary Ari Fleischer. After a newspaper reported that the NSA could listen to Osama bin Laden on his satellite phone, as Fleischer put it, the al‑Qaeda leader abandoned the device. President Bush and a long line of other officials reprised this assertion in the years to come.
But the tale of the busted satellite-phone surveillance is almost certainly untrue. The story in question said nothing about U.S. eavesdropping. And one day before it was published, the United States launched barrages of cruise missiles against al‑Qaeda training camps in Afghanistan and a factory in Sudan, including a facility that bin Laden had recently visited. After this, bin Laden went deep underground, forswearing electronic communications that might give his location away. Blaming a news story for this development, rather than a close miss on bin Laden’s life, strained all logic. Yet somehow it became an article of faith in the intelligence community.

References

American secret government programs
Intelligence agency programmes revealed by Edward Snowden
Law enforcement in the United States
Mass surveillance
National Security Agency operations
Secret government programs
Surveillance scandals
United States national security policy